Hauterive may refer to:

In Switzerland:
Hauterive, Neuchâtel
Hauterive, Fribourg
In France:
Hauterive, Allier
Hauterive, Orne
Hauterive, Yonne
In Canada:
Hauterive, Quebec, now part of Baie-Comeau

See also
Abbey of Hauterive, in Posieux, Hauterive, Fribourg, Switzerland
Hauterive-la-Fresse, Doubs department, France
Alexandre Maurice Blanc de Lanautte, Comte d'Hauterive (1754–1830)
Hauterives